This is a list of Indo pop musicians:

Solo artists
Acha Septriasa
Anggun   
Agnes Monica
Bunga Citra Lestari
Chrisye
Cinta Laura
Iwan Fals   
Fatin Shidqia
Glenn Fredly
Guruh Gipsy
Irwansyah
Kris Dayanti
Maudy Ayunda
Melly Goeslaw
Once
Rainych
Rich Brian
Rossa   
Ruth Sahanaya   
Sandhy Sondoro    
Sherina Munaf   
Titi DJ 
Tulus  
Vidi Aldiano
Vina Panduwinata

Bands
Bimbo
Cokelat 
D'Cinnamons
D'Masiv    
Dewa 19   
Efek Rumah Kaca
Gigi   
God Bless
Gamma 1
Gugun Blues Shelter
Jamrud
Jikustik
J-Rocks
Kahitna
Kerispatih
Killing Me Inside
Koes Plus   
Koil
Kotak
Letto
Maliq & D'Essentials
Mocca   
Naif   
Netral
Nidji   
Padi   
Panbers
Pee Wee Gaskins
Peterpan/Noah
Radja
Samsons
Sheila on 7   
She 
Slank
Superman Is Dead 
ST 12
The Changcuters
Tipe-X
Ungu
Wali
White Shoes & The Couples Company
Yovie & Nuno

Male groups
UN1TY
SM*SH(Smash)
Coboy Junior (2012-2014) (Now: CJR)
Super7

Female groups
JKT48 (Jakarta Forty Eight)
7icons(Seven Icons)    
Cherry Belle
S.O.S

See also
List of Indonesians
List of Indonesian musicians and musical groups
Lists of musicians

References

Pop music
Indonesia pop musicians
Pop music
Musicians